The Oregon State Beavers college football team competes as part of the NCAA Division I Football Bowl Subdivision (FBS), representing Oregon State University in the North Division of the Pac-12 Conference (Pac-12). Since the establishment of the team in 1893, Oregon State has appeared in 19 bowl games. Included in these games are three appearances in the Rose Bowl Game and one Bowl Championship Series (BCS) game appearances, in the 2001 Fiesta Bowl. This does not include the 1960 Gotham Bowl, that was canceled after bowl organizers could not find an opponent to compete against Oregon State who had already accepted the bid.

Key

Bowl games

Notes

References
General

Specific

Oregon State Beavers

Oregon State Beavers bowl games